Louise McKenzie (born 31 March 1964) is a British cross-country skier. She competed in three events at the 1988 Winter Olympics.

References

External links
 

1964 births
Living people
British female cross-country skiers
Olympic cross-country skiers of Great Britain
Cross-country skiers at the 1988 Winter Olympics
People from Badenoch and Strathspey